Bela Šefer was a Yugoslav footballer.

He was a forward and he played one match for the Yugoslav national team, named Kingdom of Serbs, Croats and Slovenes at the time.  It was afriendly match played on 10 February 1924, against Austria, a 1-4 defeat.  That year he was playing with NAK Novi Sad.  He joined NAK in 1924 coming from NTK Novi Sad. In 1929 he was playing with SK Juda Makabi.

References

Yugoslav footballers
Serbian footballers
Yugoslavia international footballers
Association football forwards
NAK Novi Sad players
Hungarians in Vojvodina
Year of birth missing
Year of death missing